St Helens, Queensland may refer to:
 St Helens, Queensland (Fraser Coast Region), a locality in the Fraser Coast Region
 St Helens, Queensland (Toowoomba Region), a locality in the Toowoomba Region
 St Helens Beach, Queensland a locality in the Mackay Region